George Robert Marten (3 May 1801 – 17 June 1876) was an English first-class cricketer who played for Cambridge University in one match in 1821, totalling 11 runs with a highest score of 9.

Marten was educated at Westminster School and Trinity College, Cambridge. He became a banker, a partner in Messrs Call, Marten & Co. with Sir William Call, 2nd Baronet and his son. Their bank was taken over in 1865 by Messrs Herries, Farquhar & Co., later acquired by Lloyds Bank. His nephew, George Marten, was also a first-class cricketer.

References

Bibliography
 

English cricketers
English cricketers of 1787 to 1825
Cambridge University cricketers
1801 births
1876 deaths
People educated at Westminster School, London
Alumni of Trinity College, Cambridge
English bankers
19th-century English businesspeople